Seán William McLoughlin (born 7 February 1990), better known as Jacksepticeye, is an Irish YouTuber, best known for his vlogs and comedic Let's Play series. , his channel has over 15.8 billion views and 28.9 million subscribers, and is the most-subscribed Irish channel. He is the co-founder of the clothing brand Cloak, along with fellow YouTuber Markiplier, and the founder and owner of the Top of The Mornin' Coffee company. He has participated in fundraisers that have raised tens of millions for charity.

Early life and education 
Seán William McLoughlin was born on 7 February 1990 in Cloghan, County Offaly, Ireland, the youngest of five children to John ( 1936 – 27 January 2021) and Florrie McLoughlin. He was raised in Cloghan and also lived for a time in Banagher. His father worked for the ESB and his mother worked a number of jobs before becoming a carer for his grandmother. McLoughlin began playing video games at the age of seven, and as a child he spent time playing on the Nintendo Game Boy in a neighbourhood treehouse, later describing how he found a sense of belonging in the games. He was given his "Jack Septic Eye" nickname after a childhood accident during a football match in which he injured his eye.

When he was 18, McLoughlin and his family moved to a cabin in Ballycumber. McLoughlin studied music technology and production at Limerick Institute of Technology. In the third year of the degree, McLoughlin decided to drop out and return home to Ballycumber. He then moved to an apartment in Athlone, County Westmeath in 2014, where he studied hotel management at Athlone Institute of Technology, earning a Bachelor of Arts degree. He lived in Athlone until 2017, when he moved to Brighton, England. Among the reasons for the move were the city's strong LGBTQ and vegan communities, and concerns about personal privacy after fans found his home in Athlone.

Internet career 

McLoughlin started uploading videos to YouTube under the name "jacksepticeye" in December 2012, initially doing voice impressions before switching to making gameplay content. In 2013, he was mentioned in a PewDiePie video, causing him to go from 2,500 subscribers to 15,000 in four days. Due to the success of his channel, McLoughlin was able to make it his full-time job by May 2014. That July, his channel had over 57 million views, having 800,000 subscribers at the time, and by August of the same year he had hit a million subscribers. By February 2015, the channel had reached one billion views and 3.2 million subscribers. The following year he gained another six million subscribers. In January 2016, he was one of the initial YouTubers signed under PewDiePie's multi-channel network, Revelmode. That year, he co-hosted South by Southwest's annual SXSW Gaming Awards.

McLoughlin co-starred as the antagonist in the second season of the YouTube Red show Scare PewDiePie. Initially planned to premiere on 9 March 2017, the season was cancelled prior to release due to controversy surrounding PewDiePie and the use of anti-semitic imagery on his channel. On 18 February 2017, McLoughlin released a video called "Let's Talk!" to his YouTube channel, which discussed PewDiePie being cut from Maker Studios as a result of the controversy. In it, he clarified that although he had tweeted in support of PewDiePie, he did not condone his actions and believed that he should have been more apologetic in response to the controversy. McLoughlin stated, "You can still be friends with someone but not agree with something they do. I don't think the world is that black-and-white." However, the next day he tweeted that he regretted focusing on criticising PewDiePie in the video, saying that he had been "naive". In a Tumblr post, he said his main regret was not commenting on the mainstream media's reporting of the controversy stating that "there were some unethical practices at play with the media, a lot of misquoting and misrepresentation." Following the controversy, it was confirmed that the Revelmode network had been shut down by Disney. Subsequently, McLoughlin was signed under the Disney Digital Network.

In June 2017, Polaris, a division of The Walt Disney Company, announced that McLoughlin would be featured in the series Polaris: Player Select on the television channel Disney XD as part of a new programming block for the channel called D | XP. Later that year, McLoughlin was featured on the RTÉ 2 two-part documentary Ireland's Rich List as one of the "top 30 earners under the age of 30", leading to him receiving a wide coverage in the Irish media and a greater exposure to people in the country who had not seen his YouTube content. In September, he was included in Forbes' list of the Top Gaming Influencers of 2017. McLoughlin toured throughout September–October 2017, in the US with his How Did We Get Here tour, and later in the UK and Europe with the Game Grumps on their Ready Player 3 tour. In January 2018, it was announced McLoughlin would produce exclusive content for livestreaming platform Twitch as part of a multi-year deal with Disney's Digital Network. That February, McLoughlin released dates for a US and Canada run of the How Did We Get Here tour. In July, he performed the How Did We Get Here show at the Just for Laughs comedy festival in Montreal. That year, he was estimated to be the eighth highest-paid YouTuber by Forbes, with an estimated earnings of $16 million.

In January 2019, McLoughlin signed with the talent agency WME and later that year signed with the multi-channel network Studio71. In October 2019, McLoughlin appeared at the Metarama Gaming + Music Festival alongside acts such as Marshmello, Logic, Ninja, and Overwatch League players. He was estimated by Forbes to be the eighth highest-paid gamer of 2019, with estimated earnings of $11 million. He was also the third most talked about gaming personality of the year on Twitter. In 2020, McLoughlin participated in Summer Game Fest, an event that ran from May to August following the cancellation of E3 2020. That October, McLoughlin announced that he would be featured in the movie Free Guy starring Ryan Reynolds, which was released in August 2021. Previously, Reynolds had appeared in a video of McLoughlin's in which they played the video game Deadpool together. McLoughlin later revealed that he had also provided advice to the director Shawn Levy on how to make the film authentic to video game culture. McLoughlin was featured on the 2020 Forbes 30 Under 30 list.

In July 2021, McLoughlin released a short film entitled "15 MONTHS" to his YouTube channel which Polygon described as "a moody and atmospheric exploration of his time during the pandemic". Later that year he signed with the talent agency CAA. According to research done by consumer electronics retailer Currys, McLoughlin was the 6th most popular gaming streamer of 2021.

In February 2022, McLoughlin announced that a biographical documentary entitled How Did We Get Here? would premiere on 28 February on Moment House, a platform that allows creators to offer ticketed online events. The documentary covers McLoughlin's life from his childhood to his career as a YouTube personality, and includes footage from his tour of the same name. The documentary was then released in coordination with Shout! Factory to video on demand platforms such as iTunes in March 2022 where it reached 29th on the US iTunes chart and 9th on the UK iTunes chart. In July 2022 episode of the Trash Taste podcast, McLoughlin said that he would likely not continue streaming on Twitch because he wanted to focus more on his edited YouTube content. In September, McLoughlin was included in Forbes' Top Creators 2022 list at number 15. He was the seventh-highest earning gaming YouTuber in 2022 according to an analysis by casino review site Casino Alpha, with an estimated income of €7.3 million from his YouTube videos that year.

YouTube content 
McLoughlin's YouTube content consists mainly of Let's Plays, as well as comedy gaming videos and vlogs. According to TheJournal.ie, the games that McLoughlin plays on his channel are "a mixture of both conventional and weird titles". His content also commonly features collaborations with other popular YouTubers, particularly Markiplier and PewDiePie who are both close friends with McLoughlin. As well as YouTubers, McLoughlin's channel has also featured traditional celebrities, including interviews with Jack Black, Karen Gillan, Tom Holland, Dwayne Johnson, Kevin Hart, Brad Pitt, Chris Hemsworth and Margot Robbie. Other content that regularly appears on his channel includes comedy sketches, short films, charity livestreams and Q&A sessions. Each of his videos begins with an intro in which he gives a high five to the camera and says "Top of the morning to ya, laddies". He chose to use a stereotypical catchphrase for his intro to express his Irish identity to viewers of his videos, wearing a flat cap for the same reason. He has speculated that his Irish identity and accent has contributed to his success, saying that "[w]hen some young lad comes around and he starts screaming in an Irish accent and swearing, it's like people getting their own Irish drug". His videos also all end with a catchphrase encouraging his audience to "punch the 'like' button in the face, like a boss!" Another theme that is present throughout McLoughlin's content is the colour green which represents his Irish heritage and is present in his YouTube logo Septic Eye Sam.

McLoughlin's videos are highly edited. They feature commentary in response to the games he plays which is improvised rather than being pre-planned, incorporating humour, funny voices, laughter and swearing. His commentary has been described as "genuine" and "authentic" by TheJournal.ie, and as composed of "talking-head, stream-of-consciousness comedy" by the Star Tribune. He calls himself the "most energetic video-game commentator on YouTube", and has described his content as an "assault on the senses" that people "either love or hate". In an interview with the Irish Independent, he described the format of his videos as him playing and talking over video games with a lot of swearing. He has cited his use of swearing as a key aspect to his success saying, "There's lots of swearing. The more you swear the better. People react very positively to that apparently." He has also said that his success is due to "an overall package of a lot of things; energy, positivity, honesty, and consistency." McLoughlin has claimed that an inclusive community is an important part of the jacksepticeye channel, stating, "One of the main things I wanted to do on YouTube is to keep people together." McLoughlin has encouraged positivity online with the slogan "positive mental attitude", utilising the phrase in videos, campaigns and merchandising.

Elements of Gothic storytelling have been identified in McLoughlin's Let's Plays of horror games and in the character of Antisepticeye which is played by McLoughlin as an evil presence on the channel. The character originated from the fandom of Markiplier in response to a similar character on his channel called Darkiplier. The presentation of the Antisepticeye character also utilises fan participation via direct addresses to the audience and interaction between the character and audience members on social media websites such as Twitter. McLoughlin's audience also engages with his content in the form of creating fan fiction.

Frequency of uploads 
For the first five years of his career, McLoughlin uploaded two videos per day, later reducing the amount to one per day. In July 2018, McLoughlin announced in a video uploaded to his YouTube channel that he would be taking his first short break from uploading to his channel, which he had uploaded daily videos to for the previous five years, citing struggles with his mental health and burnout. The video was among a wave of videos released at the time by various online content creators that focused on creator burnout and was praised by fellow YouTuber Shane Dawson who said that he had felt similar feelings. In the following years, he continued to be vocal about overwork and burnout and took multiple more breaks from uploading to his channel. In July 2020, he took a break from uploading until August, saying that he was exhausted from his uploading schedule and that he would no longer upload daily videos when he returned to making content. His first video upon his return to YouTube was viewed over 2 million times in its first day and became the top trending clip on YouTube. In January 2021, McLoughlin took a break from recording and streaming due to personal grief following the death of his father. In July 2021, McLoughlin took another break from releasing videos to his channel which lasted over a month, saying in an interview with Polygon "I feel like I’ve done it so often for so long that I just burnt myself out on it. I feel like if I’m not putting the energy that I’m known for; the energy that I like to put into my content, then I’d rather just take a step back from it and do something else."

Other ventures

Business ventures 
In October 2018, McLoughlin posted a video announcing Cloak, a clothing brand aimed at gamers which he created with Markiplier. Items were available for preorder at the time of upload, and the brand officially launched the following month. In June 2020, Cloak welcomed the Twitch streamer Pokimane as a third partner and creative director for the brand. The brand has created special edition collections in collaboration with various franchises and internet personalities including Pokimane, Minecraft Dungeons, Five Nights at Freddy's, and Rhett & Link. The brand usually donates a percentage of its sales revenue to charities, and has raised money for the World Health Organization's COVID-19 Solidarity Response Fund and The Trevor Project in this way. In a tweet posted in May 2020, McLoughlin teased that he would be launching a coffee company. On June 15, 2020, he officially announced that he was indeed launching his own coffee company, named Top of The Mornin' Coffee, and that it would start its pre-orders on the same day. He also announced that the website had partnered with the Feya Foundation, a charity aimed at combating world hunger. In addition to his YouTube content, McLoughlin also produces short-form videos for TikTok.

Philanthropy 
Business Insider has called McLoughlin "one of YouTube's most prolific philanthropists".  In 2019, he was presented with a Humanitarian Stream Team award by Save the Children for his fundraising work with them. In 2021, he was named one of Junior Chamber International Ireland's "Ten Outstanding Young Persons" for raising over $6 million for charity between 2017 and 2021. In 2022, he won Best Philanthropic Streamer at The Streamer Awards.

In December 2016, McLoughlin was a part of the Revelmode charity holiday livestream #Cringemas, with PewDiePie, Markiplier, Emma Blackery and PJ Liguori. The group raised over $1.3 million under the hashtag #EndAIDS, with matching donations from the Gates Foundation and YouTube. In December 2017, McLoughlin hosted two charity streams with Blackery and Liguori to raise money for Save The Children, raising over $260,000 for the charity.

Throughout 2018, McLoughlin hosted various fundraiser livestreams for charities such as the American Foundation for Suicide Prevention, the Depression and Bipolar Support Alliance, GameChanger and AbleGamers, charities which support ill and disabled gamers, St. Jude Children's Research Hospital, and Crisis Text Line, raising a total of over $1 million for charities that year. McLoughlin's Crisis Text Line fundraising stream was held in December and titled "Thankmas", a title that he would go on to use for subsequent annual December charity streams leading up to Christmas.

In January 2019, McLoughlin hosted a livestream which raised over $100,000 for the Make-A-Wish Foundation. In March 2019, McLoughlin headlined a Charity: Water livestream, raising over $100,000. In May 2019, McLoughlin hosted a fundraising stream for Red Nose Day 2019 raising over $110,000 in nine hours. In September 2019, McLoughlin hosted a charity livestream alongside actor Emilia Clarke, raising $260,000 for her charity SameYou which is devoted to brain injury recovery. In December 2019, McLoughlin raised over $300,000 for Child's Play for his annual Thankmas charity stream.

In January 2020, McLoughlin hosted a livestream which raised over $200,000 in four hours for the bushfires in Australia. In April 2020, McLoughlin hosted a livestream which raised over $650,000 in 12 hours for COVID-19 relief funds. Including subsequent livestreams in collaboration with McLoughlin, the #HopeFromHome campaign raised over $1.7 million. In June 2020, McLoughlin raised over $600,000 for the Black Lives Matter organisations The Bail Project, NAACP Empowerment Programs, Color of Change, and the Advancement Project. In October 2020, McLoughlin participated in the YouTuber MrBeast's Team Trees fundraising campaign, raising over $150,000 for the Arbor Day Foundation to plant trees in combat of climate change. In December 2020, for his annual Thankmas stream, McLoughlin raised over $1.4 million in 10 hours for the Red Nose Day campaign. Including subsequent livestreams in collaboration with McLoughlin, the campaign raised over $4.6 million.

In December 2021, McLoughlin teamed up with fundraising platform Tiltify and live events company Real Good Touring for his annual Thankmas stream in aid of the charity New Story which combats homelessness via methods such as 3D printing houses. Tiltify announced that it was making tools available for influencers on platforms such as YouTube, Twitch, Facebook, and TikTok to contribute to the event by hosting additional Thankmas charity streams. The campaign raised $7.6 million overall. In November 2022, McLoughlin announced he would once again be working with Tiltify and Real Good Touring to raise money for World Central Kitchen for his annual Thankmas stream, with a goal of raising $10 million overall. The goal of $10 million was successfully reached during the final hour of the stream.

Views

Views on YouTube 
McLoughlin has been critical of the changing algorithms and policies at YouTube, voicing his dissatisfaction. In November 2016, McLoughlin responded to YouTube pulling ads from "unsuitable content", stating, "This is people's careers. To completely switch how you do things and not tell anybody is a shitty thing to do." Later that year, he accused the website of using "shady tactics" and "manipulating viewers" after algorithm changes starting in September had caused channels to decrease in new views and subscribers. In May 2018, he responded to a surprise algorithm test from YouTube which changed the order of videos displayed in its subscription feed by stating, "People use the subscription tab to mainly avoid this sort of algorithmic behavior. Please keep that to the home page and recommendations."

In response to an announcement in March 2020 that enforcement of YouTube's Community Guidelines would be increasingly handled by algorithms instead of human review due to the COVID-19 pandemic, McLoughlin said "This tweet sounds ominous. To be at the mercy of a system that you admit does not work. Don’t get me wrong, I’m glad you’re letting staff stay home and isolate to keep them safe but this will scare a lot of people." In March 2022, he released a video complaining about an increased level of scams and spam comments on his videos. Similar videos were also released by Linus Sebastian and Marques Brownlee, leading to YouTube taking steps to counteract the problem. New policies were introduced which removed channels' ability to hide their subscriber counts and ability to use special characters in their channel names in order to hinder impersonation of bigger accounts. Access to enhanced comment moderation settings was also expanded to more content creators on the platform.

He has criticised the YouTube algorithm for putting pressure on creators to be constantly creating content and has discussed the problem of creator mental health with YouTube, suggesting that the company could hide video view counts similarly to Instagram's experimentation with hiding the number of likes on posts or that it could remove the dislike button. At the same time, he said that YouTube had made him less lonely and less depressed by providing his life with "purpose". McLoughlin has attributed the success of YouTube over television to its increased sense of community, and has said that "People always seek out community, wherever they can. I think YouTube’s strongest point is that sense of coming together and watching something together." McLoughlin has also spoken positively about Twitch-competitor YouTube Gaming following policy changes at Twitch reducing the revenue share taken by streamers on the site, saying "What a mess. Owned by Amazon and acting like some amateur platform. It's no wonder so many of your partners are jumping ship to YT."

Views on the video game industry 
McLoughlin has argued that video game culture should become more inclusive, and that controversies with companies like Activision Blizzard and the use of so-called "gamer words" on Twitch indicated a toxic "chad energy" in the video game industry and culture. Linking these problems to broader issues, he said "I hope whatever culture we're shifting towards is in that more accepting, open space. There's still a lot of groundwork to be doing, just like in real life and things like LGBTQ representation. But I think we're going in the right direction."

Personal life 
McLoughlin dated Danish social media influencer Signe "Wiishu" Hansen between 2015 and 2018. He is currently in a relationship with Dutch YouTuber Evelien "Gab" Smolders. McLoughlin has played the drums since he was young, and was previously in a melodic death metal-influenced metalcore band called Raised to the Ground.

Discography 
With Raised to the Ground
 Risen from the Ashes (EP, 2009)

As Jacksepticeye

Filmography

Film

Television

Web series

Games

Awards and nominations

See also 
 List of YouTubers

References

External links 

 
 
 
 

1990 births
English-language YouTube channels
Irish expatriates in England
Irish video bloggers
Irish YouTubers
Let's Players
Living people
Twitch (service) streamers
Gaming-related YouTube channels
People from County Offaly
Polaris channels
Comedy YouTubers
YouTube vloggers
Gaming YouTubers
21st-century philanthropists
Charity fundraisers (people)
YouTube channels launched in 2012
Streamer Award winners